The Sac City Chicago and North Western Depot is a historic building located in Sac City, Iowa, United States.  The city was platted in 1855, and soon after they began to campaign for a rail line into the town.  It took 23 years before the railroad arrived.  The Maple River Railroad was the first to lay tracks in Sac County in 1877, but it went to Wall Lake rather than Sac City. The Sac City & Wall Lake Railroad was formed that year and the tracks were laid between the two towns in 1878.  The Chicago & North Western Railroad acquired the line in 1884, and built a two-story frame depot in Sac City.  The business district grew up around the depot.  In 1916 the Chicago & North Western replaced the frame depot with this single story brick depot a block to the south.  It was a combination depot, passenger and freight, that utilized Chicago & North Western's Number One standard plan.

At one time there were eight passenger trains that stopped in Sac City.  Passenger service was discontinued here in 1948. The depot was used by the railroad as a freight depot until 1971, when it was sold to Youll Plumbing.  The railroad abandoned the tracks the following year.  Youll sold the building in 1976, and it became The Depot Restaurant.  In 2012 the restaurant closed and it now houses other retail establishments. The former depot was listed on the National Register of Historic Places in 2016.

References

Railway stations in the United States opened in 1916
Railway stations closed in 1971
Former Chicago and North Western Railway stations
Sac City, Iowa
Transportation buildings and structures in Sac County, Iowa
National Register of Historic Places in Sac County, Iowa
Railway stations on the National Register of Historic Places in Iowa
Former railway stations in Iowa